The Warsaw Military District was a Russian military district of the Imperial Russian Army. It covered the territory of Congress Poland (without the part of Suwałki in Vilno Military District).

The Warsaw Military District was created in 1862. When World War I broke out, most of the units of the district (three out of its five infantry corps) were used to form the 2nd Army. Since the territory of the district was overrun by German and Austro-Hungarian armies in the course of 1915, it was dissolved, and its staff used in creating the new Minsk Military District.

Composition 
The Warsaw Military District was an umbrella organisation for all Russian military establishments on its territory. Its main units were five infantry corps:

 6th Army Corps (Russian Empire) (headquarters in Łomża)
 14th Army Corps (Russian Empire) (headquarters in Lublin)
 15th Army Corps (Russian Empire) (headquarters in Warsaw)
 19th Army Corps (Russian Empire) (headquarters in Brest)
 23rd Army Corps (Russian Empire) (headquarters in Warsaw)

Commanders 
 Friedrich Wilhelm Rembert von Berg (1864–74)
 Count Paul Demetrius von Kotzebue (1874–80)
 Pyotr Pavlovich Albedinsky (1880–83)
 Joseph Vladimirovich Gourko (1883–94)
 Pavel Andreyevich Shuvalov (1894–1896)
 Alexander Imeretinsky (1896–1900)
 Mikhail Chertkov (1900–1905)
 Konstantin Maximovich (1905)
 Georgi Skalon (1905–14)
 Yakov Zhilinskiy (1914)

References 

Military districts of the Russian Empire
1862 establishments in the Russian Empire
Military areas of Poland